Jamorko Pickett (born December 24, 1997) is an American professional basketball player for the Cleveland Charge of the NBA G League. He played college basketball for the Georgetown Hoyas.

Early life and high school career
Pickett grew up in Ward 6 of Washington D.C. As a freshman, he attended Spingarn High School but did not play for the basketball team. After his previous school closed, Pickett moved to Eastern High School. He did not qualify for the team in his sophomore season before playing as a junior and assuming a leading role as a senior. Pickett played a postgraduate season at Massanutten Military Academy in Woodstock, Virginia to gain more interest from college programs. A consensus four-star recruit, he initially committed to playing college basketball for Ole Miss before switching his commitment to Georgetown.

College career
During his freshman season, Pickett scored a career-high 21 points two times in losses to Xavier. As a freshman, he averaged 9.6 points and 3.7 rebounds per game, and was named to the Big East All-Freshman Team. Pickett averaged 6.2 points and 3.8 rebounds per game in his sophomore season. As a junior, he averaged 10.2 points and 6.3 rebounds per game. On December 8, 2020, Pickett recorded 19 points and a career-high 18 rebounds in an 80–48 win against Coppin State. He helped Georgetown win its first Big East tournament title since 2007. As a senior, Pickett averaged 12.2 points, 7.2 rebounds and 2.1 assists per game. He chose to forgo his additional year of college eligibility and declare for the 2021 NBA draft.

Professional career

Detroit Pistons (2021–2022)
After going undrafted in the 2021 NBA draft, Pickett joined the Detroit Pistons for the 2021 NBA Summer League, averaging  9.8 points and 3.8 rebounds in five games. On September 24, 2021, Pickett signed a two-way contract with the Pistons, splitting time with the Motor City Cruise of the NBA G League. On June 28, 2022, the Pistons decided not to renew Pickett's contract.

Cleveland Charge (2022–present)
Pickett participated in the 2022 NBA Summer League with the Cleveland Cavaliers.

On October 24, 2022, Pickett joined the Cleveland Charge training camp roster.

Career statistics

NBA

|-
| style="text-align:left;"| 
| style="text-align:left;"| Detroit
| 13 || 0 || 13.5 || .360 || .333 || .500 || 2.5 || .5 || .0 || .5 || 3.8
|- class="sortbottom"
| style="text-align:center;" colspan="2"| Career
| 13 || 0 || 13.5 || .360 || .333 || .500 || 2.5 || .5 || .0 || .5 || 3.8

College

|-
| style="text-align:left;"| 2017–18
| style="text-align:left;"| Georgetown
| 30 || 28 || 27.5 || .363 || .357 || .745 || 3.7 || 1.8 || .4 || .6 || 9.6
|-
| style="text-align:left;"| 2018–19
| style="text-align:left;"| Georgetown
| 31 || 23 || 23.6 || .382 || .356 || .606 || 3.8 || 1.1 || .8 || 1.0 || 6.2
|-
| style="text-align:left;"| 2019–20
| style="text-align:left;"| Georgetown
| 32 || 32 || 30.9 || .383 || .376 || .757 || 6.3 || 1.1 || .7 || .9 || 10.2
|-
| style="text-align:left;"| 2020–21
| style="text-align:left;"| Georgetown
| 26 || 26 || 34.7 || .385 || .373 || .827 || 7.2 || 2.1 || 1.0 || .6 || 12.2
|- class="sortbottom"
| style="text-align:center;" colspan="2"| Career
| 119 || 109 || 29.0 || .378 || .365 || .757 || 5.2 || 1.5 || .7 || .8 || 9.4

References

External links
Georgetown Hoyas bio

1997 births
Living people
American men's basketball players
Basketball players from Washington, D.C.
Detroit Pistons players
Eastern High School (Washington, D.C.) alumni
Georgetown Hoyas men's basketball players
Motor City Cruise players
Shooting guards
Small forwards
Undrafted National Basketball Association players